Les vacances de l'amour (lit. The holidays of love) is a French TV series, the continuation of the series Le miracle de l'amour (lit. The miracle of love) which is the continuation of the successful series  Hélène et les garçons (lit. Hélène and the Boys). The main character is played by Hélène Rollès, a famous actress and singer in France. Les vacances de l'amour started in 1996 and finished in 2007.

Cast

Main Characters
 Laly Meignan as Laly Pollei
 Lynda Lacoste as Linda Carlick
 Manuela Lopez as Manuela Roquier
 Laure Guibert as Bénédicte Breton
 Philippe Vasseur as José Da Silva
 Olivier Casadesus as Olivier Legendre
 Karine Lollichon as Nathalie
 Annette Schreiber as Cynthia Stegger
 Tom Schacht as Jimmy Werner
 Patrick Puydebat as Nicolas Vernier
 Rochelle Redfield as Johanna McCormick
 Isabelle Bouysse as Jeanne Garnier
 Mike Marshall as Captain Oliver
 Hélène Rollès as Hélène Girard

Secondary Characters
 Ludovic Van Dorm as Stéphane Charvet
 Sébastien Roch as Christian Roquier
 Lucie Jeanne as Gaëlle Mulligan

Guest
 Babsie Steger as Ingrid
 Delphine Chanéac as Daphné/Sophie

References

External links
 Les vacances de l'amour on imdb

1990s French television series
2000s French television series
1996 French television series debuts
2007 French television series endings
French comedy-drama television series
1990s French comedy television series
2000s French comedy television series
TF1 original programming